Duizel en Steensel is a former municipality in the Dutch province of North Brabant, covering the villages of Duizel and Steensel.

Duizel en Steensel merged with Eersel in 1923.

References

Former municipalities of North Brabant
Eersel